Govindpuri is a colony in South East Delhi. It is recreated on top of an old graveyard and is surrounded by Kalkaji, Chittaranjan Park, and Tughlakabad. The Violet Line of the Delhi Metro passes through the area and has a metro station by the name, Govindpuri. Govindpuri is supposedly reformed on a small hill, which was previously part of a cemetery.

Constituency

Lok Sabha Constituency 
Govindpuri comes under South Delhi (Lok Sabha constituency). The MP of the area is Ramesh Bidhuri.

Vidhan Sabha Constituency 
It comes under Kalkaji Delhi Assembly Constituency.  The MLA of the area is Atishi Marlena.

Places to shop around 

 Vishal Mega Mart
 Rampuri Market

Brilliant Academic Institutions 
 The Small Wonder Play School: 630/6, Govind Puri, Kalkaji 

 Acharya Narendra Dev College, Delhi University
 Dashmesh Public School, Gali No. 7
Deshbandhu College, Delhi University

References

South Delhi district
Neighbourhoods in Delhi